Natalie Wood (1938–1981) was an American actress who started her career as a child by appearing in films directed by Irving Pichel. Wood's first credited role was as an Austrian war refugee in the Pichel-directed Tomorrow Is Forever (1946) with Claudette Colbert and Orson Welles. The following year, she played a child who does not believe in Santa Claus in the Christmas comedy-drama Miracle on 34th Street (1947) opposite Maureen O'Hara, John Payne, and Edmund Gwenn.

Wood appeared as a regular cast member in the television sitcom The Pride of the Family (1953). Two years later, she starred as a recalcitrant teenager in Rebel Without a Cause with James Dean, for which she was nominated for the Academy Award for Best Supporting Actress, and received the Golden Globe Award for Most Promising Newcomer – Female. 
The following year, Wood appeared as a kidnapped girl in the John Ford-directed western The Searchers (1956) with John Wayne and Jeffrey Hunter. Two years later, she played a Jewish student in Marjorie Morningstar (1958) opposite Gene Kelly, and an American girl living in World War II France who is caught in a love triangle in Kings Go Forth (1958) with Frank Sinatra and Tony Curtis.

In 1961, Wood starred as a teenager struggling with sexual repression in the period drama Splendor in the Grass with Warren Beatty, and as Maria in the highly successful musical film West Side Story. For the former, she received a nomination for Best Actress at the Academy Awards, British Academy Film Awards, and Golden Globes. She followed West Side Story with another musical film Gypsy (1962), in which she played the title role of the burlesque entertainer Gypsy Rose Lee. She was nominated for the Golden Globe Award for Best Actress – Motion Picture Comedy or Musical. The following year, Wood portrayed a woman who becomes pregnant following a one-night stand in Love with the Proper Stranger (1963) with Steve McQueen. For her performance she garnered her second nomination for the Academy Award for Best Actress, and Golden Globe Award for Best Actress in a Motion Picture – Drama.

In 1969, she starred in the comedy Bob & Carol & Ted & Alice about two couples who decide to pursue an open relationship. Four years later, Wood appeared opposite Robert Wagner in the television film The Affair. She received the Golden Globe Award for Best Actress – Television Series Drama for her portrayal of an adulterous wife in the miniseries From Here to Eternity (1979). Two years later, she died of drowning during the filming of her last film Brainstorm, which was posthumously released in 1983.

Film

Television

Notes

References

External links
 

Wood, Natalie
Wood, Natalie